Meols Cop High School, often abbreviated to MCHS, is a mixed 11-16 comprehensive school located in Southport, Merseyside, England. The school was opened in 1941 and originally consisted of two separate single sex secondary modern schools. One half of the building accommodated the girls and one half the boys – the hall was shared.

In 1979 the two schools amalgamated to form Meols Cop High School under the leadership of Alan Hall, the boy's secondary modern head teacher. The school now has over 700 students and the current head teacher is Mr Ian Parry as of June 2019.
The school subjects consist of Maths, English, Science, History, Geography, Religious education, Physical education, Personal social development, Business studies, Art, Food Technology, Design Technology, Computing, Resistant Materials, Drama, and Spanish.

In 2012, Ofsted reported the school as being 'Outstanding' in all areas.

As of 2017, Meols Cop High School is a member of the Education Endowment Foundation's Research Schools Network.

References

External links
 Meols Cop High School

Secondary schools in the Metropolitan Borough of Sefton
Community schools in the Metropolitan Borough of Sefton
Educational institutions established in 1941
Buildings and structures in Southport
1941 establishments in England